Maud Stevens Wagner (née Stevens; February 12, 1877 – January 30, 1961) was an American circus performer. She was the first known female tattoo artist in the United States.

Life and career
Wagner was born in 1877, in Emporia, Kansas, to David Van Bran Stevens and Sarah Jane McGee.

Wagner was an aerialist and contortionist, working in numerous traveling circuses. She met Gus Wagner—a tattoo artist who described himself as "the most artistically marked up man in America" while traveling with circuses and sideshows—at the Louisiana Purchase Exposition (World's Fair) in 1904, where she was working as an aerialist. She exchanged a romantic date with him for a lesson in tattooing, and several years later they were married. Together they had a daughter, Lotteva, who started tattooing at the age of nine and went on to become a tattoo artist herself.

As an apprentice of her husband, Wagner learned how to give traditional "hokey-pokey" tattoos—despite the invention of the tattoo machine by Samuel O'Reilly on December 8, 1891—and became a tattooist herself. Together, the Wagners were two of the last tattoo artists to work by hand, without the aid of modern tattoo machines. Maud Wagner was the United States' first known female tattoo artist.

After leaving the circus, Maud and Gus Wagner traveled around the United States, working both as tattoo artists and "tattooed attractions" in vaudeville houses, county fairs and amusement arcades. They are credited with bringing tattoo artistry inland, away from the coastal cities and towns where the practice had started.

Death
Maud Wagner died of cancer twenty years after her husband, on January 30, 1961, at her daughter's home, in Lawton, Oklahoma. She is buried at the Homestead Cemetery in Homestead Township, Chase County, Kansas.

References

1877 births
1961 deaths
American circus performers
American tattoo artists
Contortionists
People from Lyon County, Kansas
Artists from Kansas
20th-century American artists
20th-century American women artists
Deaths from cancer in Oklahoma
People from Emporia, Kansas